"None So Blind" is a science fiction short story by Joe Haldeman. It won the Hugo Award for Best Short Story and the Locus Award for Short Story in 1995, was nominated for the Nebula Award in 1994.

Plot summary
A nerd falls in love with a blind musician, and wonders, “Why aren't all blind people geniuses?” This leads him to develop an experimental procedure to repurpose the visual areas of his own brain to amplify intelligence.

Sources, references, external links, quotations

Text of the story at JoeHaldeman.com

Science fiction short stories
1994 short stories
Hugo Award for Best Short Story winning works
Works originally published in Asimov's Science Fiction